Cư Pui is a commune (xã) in Krông Bông District, Đắk Lắk Province, Vietnam. In 1999, the commune had a population of 5,630. The commune was officially established on February 2, 1987. It borders the communes of Ea Trang, Cư Drăm, Hòa Phong and Cư Elang and is located within the Chư Yang Sin National Park.

References

Communes of Đắk Lắk province
Populated places in Đắk Lắk province